Person of Jewish ethnicity is а Russian euphemism that was invented as a supposedly politically correct alternative term for an ethnic Jew. It was invented because the word "Jew" became pejorative during Soviet antisemitic campaigns.

Several officially sanctioned antisemitic campaigns took place in the Soviet Union, most notably the Doctor's Plot and the struggle against the "rootless cosmopolitans". However, the entire Jewish population was never openly and officially declared the enemy of the people. Instead, several euphemisms were used, such as Zionists, rootless cosmopolitans and "persons of Jewish ethnicity". There was an important distinction between these words: zionist and rootless cosmopolitans served as a label for "bad Jews" as enemies of the state, whereas "persons of Jewish ethnicity" was a politically correct expression for good, loyal Jews who were called by some ordinary folks as trained Jews (the original Russian word "дресированные" (dressage) typically refers to animals trained to perform in circus). However most people realized that all these euphemisms denoted all Jews. A dean of the Marxism-Leninism department at one of the Soviet Universities explained the policy to his students:

The analogous euphemism "person of Caucasian ethnicity" (Russian: лицо кавказской национальности) is used in modern Russian to refer to peoples of the Caucasus, such as Georgians or Armenians in Russia, though this expression has been criticized as there are multiple ethnic groups in the Caucasus.

See also
 History of the Jews in the Soviet Union
 List of Jewish ethnonyms
 Jew (word)#Perception of offensiveness
 Zhyd
 People-first language

References 

Antisemitism in the Soviet Union
Euphemisms
Soviet phraseology
Antisemitic slurs